The Anglo-American was an English motor tricycle produced by a York company from 1899 to 1900. The company also offered motors that it claimed were "manufactured throughout in our own works", but which were most likely Continental imports.

See also
List of car manufacturers of the United Kingdom

Vehicles introduced in 1899
1899 establishments in England
1900 disestablishments in England
Companies based in York
Defunct companies based in Yorkshire
Defunct motor vehicle manufacturers of England
Motorized tricycles
Veteran vehicles
British companies established in 1899
British companies disestablished in 1900